The African Writers Series (AWS) is a collection of books written by African novelists, poets and politicians. Published by Heinemann, 359 books appeared in the series between 1962 and 2003. 

The series has provided an international audience for many African writers, including Chinua Achebe, Ngũgĩ wa Thiong'o, Steve Biko, Ama Ata Aidoo, Nadine Gordimer, Buchi Emecheta, and Okot p'Bitek.

History

1958 – William Heinemann publishes Chinua Achebe's Things Fall Apart. 2,000 hardcover copies were printed and sold at a price of 15 shillings. The book receives widespread acclaim.

1959 – Alan Hill, head of Heinemann’s educational department, visits West Africa. He finds that Achebe remains largely unknown in his home country of Nigeria due to the small print run and high price of his first novel.

1960 – Heinemann Educational Books (HEB) is set up as a separate company and begins to publicise Achebe in Africa. They start to receive manuscripts from other African authors. Alan Hill recruits Evan McKay Milne, known as Van Milne, a West Africa specialist. He becomes HEB's Overseas Director.

1961 – Van Milne originates the idea of the African Writers Series. Hill explains that the plan was "to start a paperback series, confined to black African authors; the books were to be attractively designed with high quality production, and sold at a very cheap price—as low as 25p at the outset".

1962 – Alan Hill and Van Milne launch the African Writers Series with a paperback edition of Things Fall Apart, followed by Cyprian Ekwensi’s Burning Grass, and then Kenneth Kaunda’s autobiography Zambia Shall Be Free. Chinua Achebe is appointed Editorial Advisor with a salary of £150 a year. This is increased to £250 in 1967.

1963 – Van Milne leaves Heinemann and is replaced by Keith Sambrook.

1964 – Sambrook is concerned that the early selections for the series will not reach the educational market, particularly after the inclusion of Zambia Shall Be Free. He begins collaborating with African and non-African academics to produce publications that would more clearly meet this aim. The first result is A Book of African Verse edited by Clive Wake and John Reed, teachers at the University College of Rhodesia.

1965 – Aigboje Higo is appointed as manager of HEB Nigeria.

1967 – James Currey is appointed to work with Keith Sambrook to develop the series.

1970 – Henry Chakava is appointed as editor of HEB East Africa and becomes managing director in 1975.

1972 – Chinua Achebe leaves his position following the publication of his short story collection Girls At War as the hundredth book in the series. Sambrook, Currey, Higo and Chakava take over editorial duties collectively with the support of Akin Thomas, editorial director of HEB Nigeria.

1983 – Heinemann Group is taken over for the first time and goes through a series of takeovers in the coming years.

1984 – James Currey steps down after new management reduces new publications to only one or two a year. Of the 270 titles in the series, 15 are put out of print.

1986 – the series is relaunched by Vicky Unwin, who targets the western academic market due to the drop in spending in the African educational market.

1988 – Keith Sambrook steps down.

1992 – Caroline Avens begins to oversee the series, reducing the backlist and starting to publish more new authors.

1993 – Adewale Maja-Pearce appointed general editor.

1994 – Abdulrazak Gurnah appointed as editorial advisor.

2002 – Only 70 of the over 300 titles in the series remain in print.

2003 – Heinemann announces no new titles would be added to the series. By 2008 only 64 titles remain in print.

Content 
The African Writers Series reissued paperback editions of works previously only available as more expensive hardbacks, translated books that had been published in other languages, and published the first works of unknown writers. 

The decision to reissue paperback editions of English language hardbacks followed the early success of Things Fall Apart and continued for many years. But it became clear very quickly that there were not enough works in English, so translations began to be made from French of works by Ferdinand Oyono, Mongo Beti and others. This was followed by translations from Portuguese, Zulu, Swahili, Acholi, Sesotho, Afrikaans, Luganda, and Arabic.

At the same time, they published new authors. This started with Ngũgĩ, who helped to expand the reach of the series into East Africa. 

This approach provided opportunities for authors from across most of Africa. More than 80 titles published in the series were by Nigerian writers, who were followed by South Africans, Kenyans, Ghanaians, and Zimbabweans. In the first two decades, nearly all were men and it was only in the 1990s that books by women began to appear regularly. Some exceptions to this are early books by Flora Nwapa and Buchi Emecheta.

Novels would make up the bulk of the series, but it extended to poetry, anthologies, short stories, autobiographies, drama, non fiction, and oral traditions.

Design 

Between 1962 and 1986 all the books in the African Writers Series were colour-coded: orange for fiction, blue for non-fiction, and green for poetry and drama. While this highlighted the different genres, all books in the series during this period were numbered to give a clear indication that they belonged to a collection of works by African writers.

Some evolution in cover design did take place during these years. Between 1962 and 1965 a heavy black band was featured at the top of the covers, with a black-and-white illustration below. The black was then replaced by a solid orange block. Later a colophon was added that was intended to look like an Africanised version of Heinemann’s windmill logo. In 1971 George Hallett was employed to produce cover photography, which began to replace the use of illustrations. 

In 1986, the design was changed to appeal more in western markets. Orange was replaced by a white background with a boxed abstract image. In 1993, the was changed again to incorporate full-colour images.

Reception 
The African Writers Series includes five winners of the Nobel Prize for Literature: Wole Soyinka (1986), Naguib Mahfouz (1988), Nadine Gordimer (1991), Doris Lessing (2007), and Abdulrazak Gurnah (2021). Books in the series have also won the Commonwealth Prize, the NOMA Award for African Writing, the Caine Prize for African Writing, and Guardian Fiction Prize. In 2002, at a celebration of Africa's 100 Best Books of the Twentieth Century, Heinemann was given a prize, as 12 of the titles chosen were from the series.

Bibliography 
A definitive bibliography of the series was prepared by Nourdin Bejjit as part of his PhD research at the Open University and included in James Currey's book-length treatment of the series, with some additional information from Heinemann.

Digitisation and relaunch 
In 2005 Chadwyck-Healey Literature Collection began to digitise the series, which was completed in 2009.

It was then relaunched by Pearson Education in 2011, which began reissuing titles from the original list as 'Classics' and a number of new works.

New titles included:

 The purple violet of Oshaantu by Neshani Andreas (2011)
 Woman of the Aeroplanes by B. Kojo Laing (2011)
 Search Sweet Country by B. Kojo Laing (2011)
 The Lovers by Bessie Head (2011)
 How Shall We Kill the Bishop and other stories by Lily Mabura (2012)
 The Grub Hunter by Amir Tag Elsir (2012)
 Sterile Sky by E. E. Sule (2012)
 Mindblast by Dambudzo Marechera (2015)
In 2018 Pearson signed a digital license agreement for the series with Digitalback Book.

In December 2021, Abibiman Publishing and the James Currey Society in Oxford announced that the series would be relaunched again. The new series will be edited by the James Currey Fellow at Oxford University, Stephen Embleton. Embleton stated: "Our mandate is clear and threefold: build on the legacy of the original African Writers Series, actively seek works written in African languages, and have the writers of this Continent at the helm."

See also
List of African writers
Three Crowns Books
Writing in Asia Series

References

External links 
 Heinemann - African Writers Series
 "Heinemann African Writers Series" at African Studies Centre, Leiden.
 Jenny Uglow, "BOOKS / A voice out of Africa: A story of sweet success and bitter controversy: the low-profile but high-grade African Writers Series has just celebrated its 30th year", The Independent, 3 January 1993.

 
African literature
African writers
Heinemann (publisher) books
Publications established in 1962
Series of books